Defence Munitions Crombie is a military munitions depot  on the upper Firth of Forth in West Fife, Scotland. The depot is located on the north shore of the river, south of the village of Crombie and west of Charlestown. The site commenced operations in 1916. It was formerly known as RNAD Crombie and DMC Crombie. It is now operated as part of the UK's Defence Storage and Distribution Agency.

The depot has two jetties and a deep water channel allowing Royal Navy warships and Royal Fleet Auxiliary replenishment vessels to moor for resupply.

History
DM Crombie formerly served as the primary munitions depot for Rosyth Naval Yard, which is  downriver of the depot. Since the naval yard's closure, DM Crombie has been retained primarily as a loading/off-loading facility for naval vessels and the storage and maintenance of the Royal Air Force's air launched weapons.   In 2003 the site employed around 200 people; by 2012 this was reduced to 84 staff, all civilians.

The site occupies about 200 acres.

References

External links
 

Installations of the Ministry of Defence (United Kingdom)
Ammunition dumps in Scotland